Toukoro may refer to places in Burkina Faso:

Toukoro, Banwa
Toukoro, Comoé